A marching band is a group of instrumental musicians who perform while marching, often for entertainment or competition. Instrumentation typically includes brass, woodwind, and percussion instruments. Most marching bands wear a uniform, often of a military style, that includes an associated organization's colors, name or symbol. Most high school marching bands, and some college marching bands, are accompanied by a color guard, a group of performers who add a visual interpretation to the music through the use of props, most often flags, rifles, and sabres. 

Marching bands are generally categorized by function, size, age, instrumentation, marching style, and type of show they perform. In addition to traditional parade performances, many marching bands also perform field shows at sporting events and marching band competitions. Increasingly, marching bands perform indoor concerts that implement many songs, traditions, and flair from outside performances. In some cases, at higher level competitions, bands will be placed into classes based on school size.

History

Percussion and wind instruments were used on the battlefield since ancient times.
An Iron Age example would be the carnyx.
The development of the military band from such predecessors was a gradual development of the medieval and early modern period. 
A prototype of the Ottoman military band may be mentioned in the 11th-century Dīwān Lughāt al-Turk. 
The European tradition of military bands formed in the Baroque period, partly influenced by the Ottoman tradition. 
17th-century traveler Evliya Çelebi noted the existence of 40 guilds of musicians in Istanbul. 
In the 18th century, each regiment in the British Army maintained its own military band. Until 1749 bandsmen were civilians hired at the expense of the colonel commanding a regiment. Subsequently, they became regular enlisted men who accompanied the unit on active service to provide morale enhancing music on the battlefield or, from the late nineteenth century on, to act as stretcher bearers. Instruments during the 18th century included fifes, drums, the oboe (hautbois), French horn, clarinet and bassoon. Drummers summoned men from their farms and ranches to muster for duty. In the chaotic environment of the battlefield, musical instruments were the only means of commanding the men to advance, stand or retire. In the mid 19th century, each smaller unit had their own fifer and drummer, who sounded the daily routine. When units massed for battle a band of musicians was formed for the whole.

In the United States, modern marching bands are most commonly associated with performing during American football games. The oldest American college marching band, is the University of Notre Dame Band of the Fighting Irish, was founded in 1845 and first performed at a football game in 1887. Many American universities had marching bands before the twentieth century, which were typically associated with military ROTC programs. In 1907, breaking from traditional rank and file marching, the first pictorial formation on a football field was the "Block P" created by Paul Spotts Emrick, director of the Purdue All-American Marching Band. Spotts had seen a flock of birds fly in a "V" formation and decided that a band could replicate the action in the form of show formations on a field. The first halftime show at an American football game was performed by the University of Illinois Marching Illini, also in 1907, at a game against the University of Chicago.

Appearing at roughly the same time as the field show and pictorial marching formations at universities was the fight song, which today is often closely associated with a university's band. The first university fight song, "For Boston," was created at Boston College. Many more recognizable and popular university fight songs are borrowed and played by high schools across the United States. Four such fight songs commonly used by high schools are the University of Michigan's "The Victors", the University of Illinois' "Illinois Loyalty", the University of Notre Dame's "Victory March", and the United States Naval Academy's "Anchors Aweigh". During the 20th century, many marching bands added further pageantry elements, including baton twirlers, majorettes, dance lines, and color guards.

After World War I, the presence and quality of marching bands in the American public school system expanded as military veterans with service band experience began to accept music teaching positions within schools across the country, eventually bringing wind music and marching band into both educational curriculum and school culture. With high school programs on the rise, marching bands started to become competitive organizations, with the first national contest being held in 1923 in Chicago, Illinois. State and national contests became common, often featuring parades and mass-band concerts featuring all participating groups. By 1938, competitive band programs had become numerous and widespread, making a national contest too large to manage and leading to multiple state and regional contests in its place. Today, state contests continue to be the primary form of marching band competition in the United States.

Since the inception of Drum Corps International in the 1970s, many marching bands that perform field shows have adopted changes to the activity that parallel developments with modern drum and bugle corps. These bands are said to be corps-style bands. Areas where changes have been adopted from drum corps include:
 Marching: instead of a traditional high step, drum corps tend to march with a fluid glide step, also known as a roll step, to keep musicians' torsos completely still. Recently, corps and marching bands have been moving from the glide step to a more straight-leg style. This is a slightly different movement with a similar approach. The biggest difference being a crisp straight leg instead of a noticeable bend in the knee for glide step.  
 Auxiliaries: adaptation of the flag, rifle, baton and sabre units into auxiliaries, who march with the band and provide visual flair by spinning and tossing flags or mock weapons and using dance in the performance.
 Percussion: moving marching timpani and keyboard percussion into a stationary sideline percussion section, or "pit", which has since incorporated many different types of percussion instruments such as: tambourines, crash cymbals, suspended cymbals, bass drum and gong sets, chimes, EWI's (electronic woodwind instrument), and most keyboards.
 Competitions: marching band competitions are judged using criteria similar to criteria used in drum corps competitions, with emphasis on individual aspects of the band (captions for music performance, visual performance, percussion, guard (auxiliary), and general effect are standard).

Military style

Military bands or corps of drums were historically the first marching bands. Instrumentation in these bands varies but generally consists of brass, woodwinds, and percussion. Due to their original purpose, military marching bands typically march in a forward direction with consistent straight lines. Music is performed at a constant tempo to facilitate the steady marching of the entire military group the band is playing with. The marching step size, or interval, is consistent, and usually at a 6 to 5 (six steps per five yards) or 8 to 5 (eight steps to five yards). This style includes field music units such as drum and bugle corps or bugle bands and/or fanfare bands, pipe bands, and fife and drum corps, as well as police bands of police and fire departments. As a general rule, active-duty military marching bands often perform in parades with other military units and march in the same manner as other military personnel.

The United Kingdom keeps the military-style tradition with many civil and youth bands in all of the UK keeping the military band traditions of the country, either as marching wind bands, Corps of Drums, bugle bands, pipe bands, and in Northern Ireland, fife and drum bands. Examples would be the Royal British Legion bands and the bands of the various UK youth uniformed organizations. Styled on the UK military tradition, Fiji's Military Forces also have a marching band and the military band traditions of the Commonwealth of Nations, by extension, reached almost every country of it with military, school, civil and schools bands styled on the traditions of the British Armed Forces and the armed services of Commonwealth countries which were trained by British military personnel, in combination with local and other foreign traditions.

Military styled marching bands are present in a number of European countries in tandem with field music formations like France, the Netherlands, Germany, Austria, Portugal, Denmark and Sweden. Also, there are a number of military styled civilian bands in Russia, Belarus, Ukraine and the Baltics, as well as in Spanish-speaking Latin America and Brazil, which also march with field music units due to foreign influences in the band tradition.

Corps style

Corps style is a competitive style of band, judged in several "captions" that include visual analysis, visual proficiency, color guard, music analysis, brass, percussion, and general effect. As a general rule, corps style bands follow the traditions of the modern drum and bugle corps practice in North America and many other countries.

Traditional style

Traditional style bands, also known as show bands, are marching bands geared primarily towards crowd entertainment and perform on football fields. Typically, they perform a routine before the game, another at halftime, and sometimes after the game as well. Competitive show bands perform only one show that is continually refined throughout a season, while bands that focus on entertainment rather than competition usually perform a unique show for each game. These shows normally consists of three to five musical pieces accompanied by formations rooted in origin from Patterns in Motion, a book penned by band director William C. "Bill" Moffit, bandmaster of Purdue University All-American Marching Band and University of Houston Spirit of Houston.

A recognizable style of show band is the one fielded by historically black colleges and universities (HBCUs). HBCU bands utilize the traditional "ankle-knee" high step and music selections are largely based on R&B, hip-hop, and contemporary popular music. In addition to traditional drill formations, HBCU bands feature heavily choreographed dance routines as part of their performances. Many of these bands may have a twirler line or a dancer line, but not necessarily flag twirlers. One of the most notable depictions of HBCU bands is the 2002 film Drumline. The history of African American marching bands was explored through a 2018 exhibition called "Marching On: The Politics of Performance" in New York City. HBCU bands are a significant part of African American musical culture and HBCU bands often surpass their associated football teams in popularity, a phenomenon that is uncommon among collegiate and high school marching bands. In 1989, as part of the celebrations for the bicentennial of the French Revolution, the Florida A&M University Marching 100, one of the most prolific HBCU bands in the country, was selected as the official representative of the United States in the bicentennial parade.

Another style of show band is that used by many of the Big Ten Conference marching bands, a semi-military and semi-corps style. These bands perform a show that is designed to entertain the audience but feature more traditional symphonic styles of music (marches, film scores, jazz, or older pop music) as well as some contemporary music. Big Ten style show bands have been influential in creating some of the earliest marching band innovations, and the style is used in high schools throughout much of the United States.

Most show bands of either type include the traditional military band instrumentation of woodwinds, brass, and battery percussion. Some also include the front ensemble keyboard percussion and may also incorporate the use of a color guard for flag, and rifle routines as well as a dance line.

Carnival bands

Carnival bands are a United Kingdom variant of show bands. Carnival bands typically march in time to the music and may also participate in parades and competitions. They contain brass and percussion, but may or may not use woodwinds.

Scramble bands

Scramble bands (also referred to as 'Scatter' bands) are a variation on show bands. They generally do not march in time with the music, but, as their name implies, scramble from design to design and often incorporate comedic elements into their performances. Most of the bands in the Ivy League use this style, excepting only Cornell University.

Instrumentation

The size and composition of a marching band can vary greatly. Some bands have fewer than twenty members, and some have over 500. American marching bands vary considerably in their instrumentation. Some bands omit some or all woodwinds, but it is not uncommon to see piccolos, flutes, soprano clarinets, alto saxophones, and tenor saxophones (woodwinds are not used in drum corps). E♭ clarinets, alto clarinets, bass clarinets, and baritone saxophones are less common but can be found in some bands. Bassoons and oboes are very seldom found on a field due to the risk of incidental damage, the impracticality of marching with an exposed double reed, and high sensitivity to weather.

The brass section usually includes trumpets or cornets; French horns, alto horns, or mellophones; tenor trombones; baritone horns or euphoniums; and tubas or sousaphones. E♭ soprano cornets are sometimes used to supplement or replace the high woodwinds, while the mellophone often is used in place of the French horn. Some especially large bands use flugelhorns and bass trombones. Specially designed versions of the lower brass have been created for use while marching. These are typically wrapped in such a way that allows the bell to face toward the audience at all times. Bands may also modify their instrumentation to remove slide trombones completely and replace them with another instrument, such as a valved trombone or marching baritone horn.

Marching percussion (often referred to as the drumline, battery, or back battery) typically includes snare drums, tenor drums, bass drums, and cymbals and are responsible for keeping tempo for the band. All of these instruments have been adapted for mobile, outdoor use. Marching versions of the glockenspiel (bells), xylophone, and marimba are also rarely used by some ensembles. Historically, the percussion section also employed mounted timpani that featured manual controls.

For bands that include a front ensemble (also known as the pit or auxiliary percussion), stationary instrumentation may include orchestral percussion such as timpani, tambourines, maracas, cowbells, congas, wood blocks, marimbas, xylophones, bongos, vibraphones, timbales, claves, guiros, and chimes or tubular bells, concert bass drums, and gongs, as well as a multitude of auxiliary percussion equipment, all depending on the instrumentation of the field show. Drum sets, purpose-built drum racks, and other mounted instruments are also placed here. Until the advent of the pit in the early 1980s, many of these instruments were carried on the field by marching percussionists by hand or on mounting brackets. Some bands also include electronic instruments such as synthesizers, electric guitars, and bass guitar, along with the requisite amplification. If double-reed or string instruments are used, they are usually placed here, but even this usage is very rare due to their relative fragility. Unusual percussive instruments are sometimes used, including brake drums, empty propane tanks, trashcans, railroad ties, stomping rigs, and other interesting sounds. In modern marching band, there is a use of amplification of the front ensemble to help balance out the wind and drumline sections. The use of synthesizers and electronics in the front ensemble can not only help the front ensemble, or "pit", be heard better by the audience and judges, but it can add soundscapes such as voice-overs to help tell the story of a field show, or to add sound effects (for example, a show about nature could have bird/wind/rain sound samples performed by a front ensemble member playing the synthesizer).

A rare inclusion in a marching band that is becoming more popular is the use of electrophones in a marching band. The most common electric instrument seen is a bass guitar, but some schools also use keyboards and lead guitar. To make the electric instruments usable, external power in the stadium is often used, but some groups may use a car-battery mechanism that requires a car battery and a converter to give the instruments and amplifiers remote power. Also, some groups may use a small gasoline-powered generator.

Auxiliaries

Many bands have auxiliaries that add a visual component to the performance. For ceremonial bands, this could be a traditional color guard or honor guard. For drum & bugle corps and corps-style field bands, this could include dance lines, majorettes, auxiliary units may be collectively referred to as color guard or visual ensemble.

Auxiliaries may perform as independent groups. In the early 1970s, color guards began to hold their own competitions in the winter (after the American football season, and before the beginning of the summer drum and bugle corps season). These became known as winter guard. There are also numerous dance competitions in the off-season.

The color guard of a marching band or drum and bugle corps may contain sabers, mock rifles, and tall flags. In modern bands, other props are often used: flags of all sizes, horizontal banners, vertical banners, streamers, pom-poms, even tires, balls, and hula hoops or custom-built props. The color guard may also employ stage dressing such as backdrops, portable flats, or other structures. These can be used simply as static scenery or moved to emphasize drill and are often used to create a "backstage" area to store equipment and hide personnel when necessary.

While military color guards were typically male, band color guards tend to be primarily female, though it is becoming more common for men to join as well. A few independent units are all-male. Guard members nearly always wear a special uniform or costume that is distinctive from that of the band, not necessarily matching in design or color. The men's and women's guard uniforms are usually designed in one of two ways: nearly identically, but with gender-specific parts (i.e., skirts) adapted for the use of the opposite sex; or complimentarily, with the two uniforms designed similarly but with variations in color or form. The color guard uniform, especially in a high school marching band, need not be in school colors; in fact, they rarely are. These uniforms are designed to represent a certain aspect of the halftime show, characterize the guard members through costumes, or tell some sort of story, and can thus be in any design or color (a surprisingly common complaint among the high school audience is that guard uniforms and equipment "aren't school colors").

Indoor color guards have become popular within high schools and universities throughout the United States. These groups perform a theme-based show in competitions after the outdoor marching band season ends. Indoor color guard shows are typically performed in school gymnasiums and are adjudicated.

Personnel
Irishman Patrick S. Gilmore started the concept of a bandleader. A marching band is typically led by one or more drum majors, also called field commanders, who are usually responsible for conducting the band (sometimes using a large baton or mace, though such tools are used rarely in modern marching bands for conducting) and are commonly referred to as the leader of the band. When there is more than one drum major, one may be the head drum major, who often stands upon an elevated podium located on the 50-yard line while conducting, whereas the other(s) often conduct from convenient angles (should the marching block not be facing forward) and function as an apprentice of sorts. The number of members in the band often determines how many drum majors are needed, based on the complexity of the show (in which case, in a three-person scenario, one stands on the 50-yard line while another stands on the 30-yard line and the third stands on the other 30-yard line), and occasionally, additional individuals may be asked to perform brief conducting duties if beneficial in a particularly tricky part of the show (more often, such people are those on the sidelines or in the pit). The modern-day concept of the drum major has been exponentially expanded upon by George N. Parks, often known as the "Dynamic Drum Major," through his Drum Major Academy. Bands may also be led by a more traditional conductor, especially during field shows, where a stationary conductor on a ladder or platform may be visible throughout the performance. Aural commands—such as vocal orders, clapping, or a whistle—may be used to issue commands as well. In show bands, particularly in HBCU and Big Ten bands, drum majors often have a visual on-field role with a baton or mace, with the job of conducting assigned to the band director(s). In these cases, the number of drum majors is often based on tradition, rather than being in proportion with the number of musicians. For example, the Florida A&M Marching 100 fields one drum major for each president in the university's history. Other leaders within the band may include field lieutenants and captains of sections such as brass, drumline, and woodwinds, and members that lead a section, squad, row, etc.

Some bands assign drum majors the dual role of leading and conducting the ensemble on the field. This is most common in traditional military-style groups, such as Texas A&M's Fightin' Texas Aggie Band: the drum majors march with the band, sound whistles to coordinate movement, and use maces to keep time by thrusting them up and down (rather than toward and away from the body, as is typical in American military bands).

The size of the band may not only determine how many drum majors there are, but how many section instructors are needed as well. Section instructors function like the music director but are mainly responsible for teaching members of a given section. Because they are commonly previous members of the section they teach, they can provide better instruction to combine the needs of the show with the characteristics of the given instrument.

As bands require leadership from within as well as from without, section leaders are usually selected from among the members of each instrumental section (a "section" comprises all the band members who play the same musical instrument). The section leader is always an experienced band member and is usually selected by the band director (rather than elected or self-appointed) for his or her leadership skills and experience. The section leader is responsible for the minute-to-minute instruction of his or her section members, and reports to the drum majors and the band director. Many larger bands appoint more than one section leader per section, with each having a "head" section leader, whether formally or informally designated as such. College-level military bands may use the term "section sergeant" or "section officer" in place of "section leader."

The director provides general guidance, selects the repertoire, interprets commentary and evaluations from judges, and auditions or recruits prospective members. What content is not provided by the director may be contracted from arrangers (who compose original works or adapt existing works) and copyists (who reproduce parts of the score), choreographers, and drill designers (primarily for field bands). With the assistance of section instructors, the director also teaches performance techniques—musical, martial, and visual—and assesses the pool of talent, choosing leaders and soloists as needed. The director also selects venues for public performance and oversees the staff that help provide funding and equipment. Many opportunities for member improvement are present: the director may organize clinics with various professionals, send representatives to specialty schools or camps, or plan trips abroad for education or exhibition.

Large bands also require many support staff who can move equipment, repair instruments, and uniforms, create and manipulate props used in performances, and provide food, water, and medical assistance. Additional staff may be utilized when the band hosts functions such as competitions and reviews. In high school bands, these activities are usually performed by volunteers, typically parents of band members or the band members of the lower grades. These people are often referred to as runners or boosters. Significant support staff for college bands and independent corps are typically paid by the university or the corps organization, respectively.

Performance elements

The goal of each band's performance is different. Some aim for maximum uniformity and precision; others—especially scramble bands—want to be as entertaining as possible. Many U.S. university marching bands aim for maximum sound impact on the audience. Some bands perform primarily for the enjoyment of their members. However, there are some common elements in almost all band performances. The following overview is heavily focused on the U.S. marching band tradition.

Music

The traditional music of the marching band is the military march, but since show bands also evolved from the concert and brass band traditions, music has always been varied. Often, music from other genres is adapted for the specific instrumentation of a marching band.

Commercial arrangements that are tailored for the average band instrumentation are also available. Many bands typically have a repertoire of traditional music associated with the organization they serve. Some competitive bands use an arrangement of popular music varied for marching band, as well as music from a movie or other such theme. However, the largest and most successful marching bands tend to steer clear of show tunes and popular music, instead preferring compilations or arrangements of classical or traditional concert pieces (i.e., Stravinsky's The Rite of Spring or Puccini's Nessun Dorma) or of entirely new compositions.

Music may be memorized, or it may be carried on flip folders, which are held by lyres that clip onto the instruments. Having music memorized is usually considered an advantage for competitive bands, and at competitions, there is usually a penalty for the use of the sheet music on the field written into the scoring rubric. Practically, memorization prevents obstruction of vision caused by the folders. The memorization of music is usually a matter of pride for the marching band, however, bands that regularly pull from expansive libraries and perform dozens of new works each season are more likely to utilize flip folders.

Marching technique

Glide step

The glide step, also commonly known as the roll step, involves bringing the heel gently to the ground with the toe pointed up, and then rolling forward onto the toes before lifting the foot to continue forward. While marching to the rear, the weight is placed continually on the ball of the foot with the heel elevated. This style is used by both marching bands as well as drum and bugle corps. The style, in comparison to high step, gives drill formations a more fluid appearance, allowing for better control of more difficult formations and various styles of music. With this control also comes the ability to perform a much broader range of tempos. Proper execution of a roll step gives a player marching at 40 beats per minute the same smooth tone as a player marching at 180. The roll step allows for much better control of the upper body, and thus better control of the air support needed for playing.

Some bands, and a select few drum and bugle corps, use a bent-knee variant of roll step, usually known simply as bent knee, in which the members roll from heel to toe but lead the next step with the knee instead of the foot, then planting the heel of the next foot by straightening the leg.

High step

The high step is a style of marching used by many colleges and universities, including most bands of HBCUs and the Big Ten. Four primary sub-variants of the high are used:

 The ankle-knee step involves bringing the foot up to the inside of the leg to the knee before coming down and forward. This is the style used by most bands from HBCUs.
 The chair step involves lifting the knee until the thighs are parallel to the ground, and with toes pointed downward. When the leg is elevated to its maximum height, a ninety-degree angle exists between the torso and the thigh, as well as between the thigh and shin. The leg is then lowered, and this is repeated in an alternating fashion between the legs. This style is used by many schools in the Big Ten.
 The extended high step, much like the chair step, involves the thigh being parallel to the ground and perpendicular to the body, but instead with the shin extended outward at a forty-five-degree angle from the body and with toes pointed downward. The leg is then driven quickly back to the ground while the other leg repeats in this fashion.
 The "stop-at-the-top" is a style similar to the chair step and is currently used only at the University of Wisconsin Marching Band. It involves bringing the leg up so that the thigh is at a 45-degree angle with the ground with the toes pointed as far down as possible. While the chair step is almost always used as merely a special decorative step, stop-at-the-top is the Wisconsin band's default marching style.

An integral part of this style of marching is known as stop action, meaning that all movement ceases momentarily at the apex of each step. This requires a band to have a great deal of stamina, though is effective visually. High step marching is often accompanied by a horizontal swing of the player's body or instrument.

Lateral marching

When band members are marching in one direction but want to focus their sound on another, they may rotate their bodies at the waist, so that only the upper portion of the body faces in the direction of play. This is known as lateral marching, but is more commonly known as either shifting, traversing, or sliding. A lateral march is not a change in the direction of march, only in the direction the upper body faces. Percussion players, whose large drum harnesses often prevent them from twisting their torsos, and sometimes tuba and sousaphone players, instead uses a crab step when moving sideways. During a crab step, the musician crosses one leg over the other, either marching on the toes or rolling the foot sideways. Percussionists may also substitute roll step when their instruments would interfere with performing the high step.

Changing direction

A true direction change involving the feet moving in a new direction requires either a prep step or a pivot, both of which are sometimes referred to as a flank or “stab”. To perform a prep step, on the last count of movement in the first direction a marcher plants the foot with the heel turned outward at half the angle of the turn desired, with the upper body still facing forward. On the next count, the other foot snaps into position completing the turn. The upper body may or may not turn with the lower body. Some bands plant the heel on the prep step rather than the toe but preserving the angle of the foot. To perform a pivot, the marcher pivots between directions over the ball of the foot on the last count instead of using a prep step.

Backward marching

A back march may be used when the band wishes to move in the opposite direction from where it is projecting its sound. There are several ways to back march, one of which is to walk backward, putting each foot down and rolling from the toe to the heel (the exact reverse of the roll step). Another variation involves marching on the platforms of the feet, dragging the toe of the moving foot on the ground. Backward marching usually employs the same preference for leg straightness as forward marching (if the band marches with legs completely straight while marching forwards, they also do so while marching backward, to preserve uniformity of style). Using peripheral vision to align oneself to formations or field markings is even more important during backward marching.

Marking time

When a band is not moving, the members may mark time, or march in place. The step used usually resembles the step that is used for marching forward, though mixing a high step mark time with a roll step march (or vice versa) produces an interesting visual effect. For a typical mark time, the foot is raised to the ankle bone of the opposite leg. The toe should not come off the ground and the knee should not come out much past the still-straight leg.

Some bands mark time by bringing their feet up to their knee—known as high-mark time. Some bands practice marking time during concert arch with the toes coming off of the ground to give the marcher a greater sense of marching while standing still. The heel should hit the ground on the beat. Some bands forgo marking time and instead come to a complete halt when not marching. Traditionally, the drumline would put their feet in a V-shape and lift their feet fully off the ground a few inches. This is to avoid hitting the drums.

Staying in step
Even when marking time, it is considered good form for all band members to stay in step—that is, step with the same foot at the same time. A large majority of bands step off with, or start marching on, the left foot. Staying in step is generally easier when the band is playing music or when the drums are playing a marching cadence.

When the band and percussion are not playing, rhythm may be maintained in a variety of ways: a drummer may play taps or rim shots, the drum major may clap or use a woodblock, a drum major or band member may vocalize a sharp syllable like "hit," "hut," or "dut," or band members may chant the military call of "left, left, left right left." Band members may count the steps of the move out loud to keep the entire band together. Typically, most moves consist of any number of steps that are a multiples of two or four, due to most marching band music being in even numbered time signatures. Even-numbered time signatures aid in staying in step because they assign odd-numbered counts to the left foot, and even-numbered counts to the right foot. If a band member is on the wrong foot, for instance, odd on the right foot and even on the left, this is referred to as being out of step. When a band member is completely off tempo, it is referred to as being out of phase.

Parade marching

In parades, bands usually line up in a marching block composed of ranks and files. Each member tries to stay within his or her given rank and file, and to maintain even spacing with neighboring musicians. It is traditionally the responsibility of the people at the end of each rank and the front of each file to be in the correct location; this allows other band members to use them as a reference, also known as guiding.

Band members also try to keep a constant pace or step size while marching in parade. Step sizes usually vary between 22 and 30 inches (56–76 cm) per stride. A step size of 22.5 inches is called an 8-to-5 step because the marcher covers five yards (about 4.6 m) in eight steps. A step size of 30 inches is called 6-to-5 because five yards are covered in six steps. Because yard lines on an American football field are five yards apart, exact 8-to-5 and 6-to-5 steps are most useful for field shows.

A drum cadence, sometimes called a walk beat or street beat, is usually played when the band is marching, oftentimes alternating with a song, and is typically how a band keeps time while not playing music. Alternatively, a drum or rim shot may be given on the odd beats to keep the band in step. Between songs and cadences, a roll is usually given to indicate what beat in the measure the band is at. Cadence tempo varies from group to group.

Street performances

In Minnesota, Upstate New York, and Wisconsin, bands may perform on city streets with compact formation elements, sometimes referred to as a street show. These shows are judged using similar criteria as any other marching band competition. Elements of difficulty increase with street marching competitions because of the varying widths of streets in each community. Street marching is typical for bands who operate during the spring and early summer months. Typically, a band that performs in street marching competitions does not become involved with field marching, and vice versa. Various venues exist for street marching competitions between high school marching bands.

Field marching

While playing music during a field show, the band makes a series of formations, called drill, on the field, which may be pictures, geometric shapes, curvilinear designs, or blocks of musicians, although sometimes it may be pure abstract designs using no specific form.

Typically, each band member has an assigned position in each formation. In many show bands and most drum corps, these positions are illustrated in a handheld booklet called a drill book (also known as a dot book). Drill books, or drill charts, show where each person stands during each set of the show. The drill charts include yard lines and hashes as they would be on an actual football field, which shows the band members where to stand relative to the yard lines and hashes. There are many ways of getting from one formation to the next:
 Each member moves independently called scattering or scatter drill.
 All members move together without deforming the formation—called floating.
 Members stay in their lines and arcs, but slowly deform the formation—sometimes called rotating, expanding, or condensing.
 Members break into ranks or squads, each of which performs a maneuver (such as a follow-the-leader) which may or may not be scripted. An unscripted move is sometimes called a rank option.
 Each member performs a specifically scripted move. In these cases, the desired visual effect is often the move itself and not the ending formation.
 Members at an extended halt perform a stationary visual move, such as a ripple (like "the wave") or some sort of choreography, that may propagate throughout the formation of band members.

Players may point the bells of their instruments in the direction they are moving, or slide (also called traverse) with all the bells facing in the same direction. They may also point it towards the center of the field. Bands that march in time with the music typically also synchronize the direction of individuals' turns and try to maintain even spacing between individuals in formations (called intervals). Sometimes bands specifically have wind players turn their instruments away from the audience to emphasize the dynamics of the music.

Auxiliaries can also add to the visual effect. Backdrops and props (scrims) may be used on the field that fit the theme of the show or the music being performed. In comedic shows, particularly for university bands, an announcer may read jokes or a funny script between songs; formations that are words or pictures (or the songs themselves) may serve as punch lines.

Fundamental commands and drill down

In some marching bands, the drum majors have the option to give out a set of commands to the rest of the band either vocally, by hand command, or by a whistle. These commands originated from the military history of marching band. Different bands might have different sets of procedures such as the number of counts it takes to carry out the command, but the overall result is the same.
 To the ready/Standing by/Rest/Relax: the command tells the band to stand with heads slightly bowed, feet shoulder-width apart. The band often automatically does this when they first march onto a field at the beginning of their show.
 Band atten-hut/Band ten-hut/Set: the command that tells the band to go into the position of attention, a military posture. The band usually responds with a loud verbal response, such as "One!", "Hut!" or "Hit!"
 Mark time march: the command tells the band to march in place in rhythm to snare taps, normally before they march off.
 Forward march, sometimes forward harch: This command tells the band to begin marching, in time, and in step. They step off on the left foot and end on the right.
 Detail halt/Band halt: this command tells the band to stop marching. Normally they mark time for two beats, saying "One, two" or "Dut, dut" on these beats, to ensure they end on the correct foot.
 At ease: this tells the band that they may completely relax.
 Parade rest: the command that tells the band to put their feet shoulder wide and join both hands in the front of their body or to put both feet together or in a V-formation and roll their elbows out and put both hands in fists resting on the hip (the upper-body portion is usually only utilized when marching without instruments, sometimes the second option's lower body form and the first option's upper-body form is used).
 Left face: the command to turn the band 90 degrees to the left while at the position of attention.
 Right face: the command to turn the band 90 degrees to the right while at the position of attention.
 About face: the command to turn the band 180 degrees to the rear while at the position of attention.
 Horns up: the command for wind players to bring their instruments to playing position (mouthpiece on or near the mouth).
 Horns thrust: this command for wind players instructs the band to bring their horns to a thrust position where their instruments are perpendicular to the ground and their mouthpieces are level with their eyes.
 Horns carry: this command for wind players instructs the band to put their instrument under their right arm.
 Dismissed/Fall out: this command generally releases the band either for the day or for another portion of the rehearsal.
 To the left flank: this command turns the band 90 degrees sinistrally while marking time. It is not to be executed until the director/drum major shouts the command "hut" or "march."
 To the right flank: this command turns the band 90 degrees dextrally while marking time. It is not to be executed until the director/drum major shouts the syllable "hut" or "march."
 To the rear: this command turns the band 180 degrees while marking time. It is not to be executed until the director/drum major shouts the syllable "hut" or "march".
 Dress center/right/left dress: this command has the band bring their hands together at eye-level and to turn their heads toward the center, right, or left of the block (if one is in the center, one simply puts one's head down). While dressing, the band can adjust the block to have better spacing. No commands other than "Ready front" (sometimes "Eyes front") can be executed while Dressing is in action.
Ready front/Eyes front: this command makes a band exit dress center for attention.
 Cover down: this command tells the band to line up their files and make sure they are straight.
Aside from field show and parade, competitions among secondary schools can also have the march off (also concentration block or drill down). This event involves all participants on the field following the commands of the director or a drum major. If a participant makes a mistake, either by execution or wrong timing, then the participant falls out of the field. A winner is crowned when there is only one participant left on the field.

Delay

Each musician in a marching band creates sound waves. The waves from each musician, traveling at the speed of sound, reach the other musicians, field conductors, and listeners at slightly different times. If the distance between musicians is large enough, listeners may perceive waves to be out of phase. Typically, in this case, listeners perceive that one section of the band is playing their parts slightly after another section. This delay effect is informally referred to as ensemble tear or phasing (not to be confused with the music composition technique of the same name).

Consider also that viewers perceive the movement of marchers as light waves. Since light travels faster than sound, viewers may perceive that movement is out of phase with the sound. Sound waves may also reflect off parts of the stadium or nearby buildings.

For example, if two musicians, one standing on the front sideline of the football field and one on the back sideline, begin playing exactly when they see the beat of the conductor's baton or hand, the sound produced by the musician on the front sideline reaches listeners in the stands noticeably before the sound played by the back musician, and the musicians are seen to move before the sound reaches the stands.

Ensemble tears can occur when musicians on the field listen to the pit. Because of the way sound waves travel, the sound pit produces first bounces off the back bleachers and then is heard by the ensemble. By the time the ensemble hears them, they are already late in timing. Because of this reason, the norm is to ignore the pit and let them listen to the ensemble for timing.

Delay can be reduced in several ways, including:
 using compact formations;
 instructing players to watch field conductors, to get a uniform idea of tempo;
 instructing musicians to make constant adjustments and watch or listen to sources of tempo to make their sound reach the audience at the same time as other musicians;
 instructing players located near the back of the field watch the drum major, and all other players to listen back, playing along with those watching the drum major;
 instructing players to keep track of time and rhythm on their own (internalize the tempo);
 instructing the percussion to call out counts, or do rimshots (sometimes called cheaters) when they are not playing;
 instructing players to ignore the delay and realize that listeners hear the sound waves in phase. This most often occurs when the band is spread out, but in groups (e.g., the four corners of the football field in 4 groups). In this case, the sound reaches the center of the stadium and the center of the stands at the same moment provided the band members are not correcting for each other.

Uniforms

Nearly all marching band personnel wear some kind of uniform. Military-style uniforms are most common, but there are bands that use everything from matching T-shirts and shorts to formal wear. The school or organization's name, symbol, or colors are commonly applied to uniforms. Uniforms may also have substantially different colors on the front and back, so if band members turn suddenly (flank), the audience sees a striking change of color. Band members at many Ivy League schools wear a jacket and tie while performing. The Southern Methodist University band wear a different combination of jackets, vests, ties, shirts, and pants for each half (changing before halftime) of each game and no clothing or uniform combinations are repeated during the marching season. The Alma College Kiltie Marching Band is famous for wearing kilts made of the official Alma College tartan.

The components of a band uniform are numerous. Common design elements include hats (typically shakos, pith helmets, combination hats or other styles of helmets) with feather plumes, capes, gloves, rank cords, and other embellishments. The USC Spirit of Troy Marching Band and Troy University's Sound of the South Marching Band wear traditional Trojan helmets. It is also common for band uniforms to have a stripe down the leg and light-colored shoes, or spats over dark shoes to emphasize the movement of the legs while marching. Similarly, uniforms may feature additional components which highlight movement of the upper body, such as the "wings" worn by the University of Minnesota's marching band to highlight flanking movements on the field. Competitive bands, however, many times opt for matching uniforms, especially pants and shoes (usually white or black) to hide the visual effect of members who are out of step as seen from a distance. Occasionally, a band forgoes traditional uniforms in favor of costumes that fit the theme of its field show. The costumes may or may not be uniform throughout the band. This kind of specialized uniform change is usually confined to competitive marching bands.

Drum Majors, the field commanders and band directors, usually do not wear the regular band uniform, to better distinguish them from the rest of the band. Some wear more formal outfits or costumes that match the theme of the music, or most commonly a differently designed version of the regular band uniform, often employing different colors (especially white) or features such as capes. Some (especially at the college level) still employ the tall wool-lined shako or much larger bearskin (both often derisively referred to as a "Q-Tip hat"). Sousaphone players may use a military-style beret or entirely forgo the use of a head covering, as most hats may be in the way of the bell. Some auxiliary groups use uniforms that resemble gymnastics outfits: Often, these uniforms are themed, drawing inspiration from the music. Many auxiliary groups change the outfits they use from season to season based on the needs of the band, although some that do also have a "base" uniform for occasions such as parades or other ceremonies.

Rehearsals

Music for parade and show bands is typically learned separately, in a concert band setting. It may even be memorized before any of the marching steps are learned. When rehearsing drill, positions and maneuvers are usually learned without playing the music simultaneously—a common technique for learning drill is to have members sing their parts or march to a recording produced during a music rehearsal. Many bands learn drill one picture or form at a time, and later combine these and add music.

Rehearsals may also include physical warm-up (calisthenics, running, etc.), music warm-up (generally consisting of breathing exercises, scales, technical exercises, chorales, and tuning), basics (simple marching in a block to practice proper technique), and sectionals (in which either staff or band members designated section leaders rehearse individual sections).

When learning positions for drill, an American football field may be divided into a 5-yard grid, with the yard lines serving as one set of guides. The locations where the perpendicular grid lines cross the yard lines sometimes called zero points or gacks, may be marked on a practice field at eight-, four-, or two-step intervals. Alternately, band members may only use field markings—yard lines, the centerline, hash marks, and yard numbers—as guides (but note that different leagues put these markings in different places).

For members to learn their positions more quickly, they may be given drill charts, which map their locations relative to the grid or field markings for each formation. In other groups, spray chalk or colored markers are used to mark the location of each person after each set of drill, with a different color and, sometimes, shape for each move.

Some bands use small notebooks, also known as a dot book or drill book, which they hang about their necks, on the drum harness, or around the waist. These contain pages of drill charts, which often either give a picture or list coordinates that band members use to find 'pages' or 'sets' on the field. Coordinates are normally listed in 8-to-5 steps off the front sideline and front and back hashes, along with the number of 8–5 steps off of the yard line listed on each page. Some bands are even using small plastic pouches that hang about their neck on an adjustable strap, which has a zipper pocket for holding drill, flags to mark sets, and a pencil. There is also a clear plastic window in front to display the current part of drill being worked on at that point in time.

Uniquely, the Fightin’ Texas Aggie Band of Texas A&M University requires its members to create their own reference cards by hand as they learn each new drill. This is due to the band’s traditional straight-line military style, which emphasizes long periods of continuous marching in a single direction at a standard angle, thus requiring members to focus on the uniformity of the entire band rather than their individual position on the field.

Members may also group into squads, ranks, sections, or (especially with scramble bands that primarily form words) letters. Instead of each member having an individual move, moves are then learned on a squad-by-squad (rank-by-rank) basis.

Band camp

Most bands meet in the summer, normally in August for summer training, or prior to the specific marching season (known as band camp). This involves learning basic marching fundamentals such as the type of marching step the band uses, commands from the drum major, and how to move on field. The band is also given music to learn for their show. Drill for the show may or may not be provided to learn during band camp. The camp takes place outdoors on the field for marching, and in a band hall for music-only rehearsals. Sectionals, or rehearsals including all of one instrument (e.g., flute sectional), take place during this time. Directors may use time during band camp to place band members in their sections based on playing or marching level and ability. This time can also be used for the potential drum majors to showcase their abilities and for the band director to choose who is head drum major. For bands that require auditions for the band, drumline, or auxiliary, auditions may happen the first few days for placement. Band camp usually lasts 1–2 weeks, but in the case of a more advanced marching band, camp may last up to a month. In most university bands, band camp means an earlier move-in date for university students in the band.

American football games

Marching bands serve as entertainment during American football games, which may also be known as pep band. For college and high school marching bands, this is the primary purpose of the ensemble. The home team's band plays the national anthem before kickoff (often as part of a pre-game show), as well as other music while in the stands during the game. Bands cheer with the cheerleaders, and some bands create their cheers. Marching bands then perform a show during halftime. When both teams' bands are present, it is a common protocol for the visiting band to perform first. After halftime, some high school bands use the third quarter of the game to take a break and get food. College bands and some high school bands do not have such breaks but continue playing in the stands during the entirety of the game. The band often stays the entire game, playing the school's fight song and alma mater at the end of the game regardless of the outcome.

Three National Football League teams designate an official marching band: the Washington Commanders, Buffalo Bills and Baltimore Ravens. Marching bands were once common fare during Super Bowl halftime shows during its earlier years but were later replaced by short stadium rock concerts from high-profile recording artists, some of which have incorporated marching bands into their performances. Marching bands are otherwise uncommon at the professional level.

Competition

In competition, marching bands are usually judged on criteria such as musicality, uniformity, visual impact, artistic interpretation, and the difficulty of the music and drill. Competition exists at all levels but is most common in the U.S. among secondary school bands and drum and bugle corps. Performances designed for a competition setting usually include more esoteric music (including but not limited to adaptations of modern orchestral pieces). Many traditional-style bands compete in contests known as a Battle of the Bands, similar to the Atlanta Classic from the movie Drumline. There are also competitions at the national level, such as the Bands of America (BOA) Grand National Championships through Music for All .

Although its legitimacy is often called into question, competitive marching band is sometimes considered a sport, due in large part to the physical exertion required in combination with teamwork. Many HBCU marching band fans refer to marching band as marching sport. Sports Illustrated considered the activity a sport in 1987, describing the Drum Corps International World Championships “one of the biggest sporting events of the summer.” In the same article, Sports Illustrated quoted basketball coach Bobby Knight, "If a basketball team trained as hard as these kids do, it would be unbelievable. I like to take my players [to watch drum corps] to show them what they can accomplish with hard work and teamwork. Besides, once they see them practice 12 hours a day, my players think I’m a helluva lot easier.”

In his presentation to the American College of Sports Medicine's annual meeting in 2009, researcher and exercise physiologist Gary Granata presented research after studying members of the Avon High School Marching Black and Gold, noting "At the top levels of marching band and drum corps, you get a level of competition and athleticism that is equal to a Division I athletic program." Granata further pointed out, "Performers are constantly moving, and often running, at velocities that reach 180 steps or more per minute while playing instruments that weigh up to 40 pounds."

Moreover, in an ESPN segment from 2005, researchers from Indiana State University placed devices on Drum Corps members that recorded metabolic rates during performances and practices, utilizing measurements of oxygen consumption, carbon dioxide production, and heart rate. The findings were that the performer's metabolic rates matched those of marathon runners halfway through a marathon, while the heart rate was more along the lines of someone who was running a "400 or 800-meter dash."

Spring competitions

Spring and early summer parade marching (or street marching) are popular in the northern midwest and Upstate New York, where temperatures are moderate enough for students to march distances in standard uniforms. Performance styles range from traditional block marching to elaborate productions with evolving drill patterns.

Summer competitions

Some circuits in the United States continue to hold field show competitions during the summer months. Much like drum corps, these bands rehearse and tour full-time for about a month from mid-June to mid-August. Such circuits include the Mid-America Competing Band Directors Association, or MACBDA, and the Catholic Youth Organization circuits.

The Honda Battle of the Bands is an annual marching band exhibition that features performances by HBCU bands. Seemingly contradictory to the name, Honda's "battle" is not a competition in the traditional sense. That is, no winner is crowned during the event. Rather, the bands compete for the favor of the audience, each other, and the greater community.

WAMSB (World Association of Marching Show Bands) is an international organization holding many competitions throughout the world. Its World Championships are held annually in the summer in a different country. Past host nations include Canada, Brazil, Japan, Malaysia, Denmark, Germany, Italy, & Australia. WAMSB sanctioned events happen in 32 nations.

The Central Indiana Track Show Association hosts contests in Indiana during the summer. The championships for CITSA is the Indiana State Fair Band Day competition, held every August at the Indiana State Fair.

Fall competitions

Most high school marching band competitions occur in the fall when the majority of schools begin classes. In the United States, there are two national competition circuits in which bands can compete: Bands of America and the United States Scholastic Band Association (USSBA).

The USSBA was formed in 1988 through the help of the Cadets Drum and Bugle Corps. Over 700 high school bands compete during the Fall season with bands of similar size and talent. Each competition provides approximately 40 professional judges who give feedback on the show's programming and design. At the season's end, the top 50 bands are invited to compete in the US Scholastic Band Championship, which is hosted at a college or professional stadium.

Bands of America is the other major circuit that conducts several competitions throughout the fall season. Competitions include Regional Championships, held in collegiate stadiums in locations such as Pennsylvania, California, Ohio, Texas, and North Carolina, and Super Regional Championships held in NFL stadiums in cities such as Atlanta, Indianapolis, and St. Louis. The season accumulates with the holding of Grand National Championships, considered the top event for high school marching. Grand Nationals takes place in Lucas Oil Stadium in Indianapolis, Indiana in early to mid-November. The three-day event concludes with the top 12 highest scoring high school bands, out of the more than 90 who participate, performing in Grand National Finals on Saturday night. Due to the stiff competition, with bands traveling to the event from throughout the country, many people consider the champion the best high school marching band in the country. There are no qualifications for any Bands of America events, including Grand Nationals. Admittance is based on a first-come, first-served basis.

Many states have their own competition circuits, as well as their own rules for competitions in their circuits. Several colleges host annual independent competitions, with varying degrees of prestige—such as the Contest of Champions at Middle Tennessee State University, which is the longest-running high school band contest in the United States.

To make competitions fair, bands normally split into different classes or divisions based on certain factors. One popular classification system uses the size of the school to split up the competing bands. This is the method used by Bands of America, the Indiana State School Music Association, Kentucky Music Educators Association and the University Interscholastic League. Alternatively, the number of band members determines the class—with the largest bands being Division I, and smaller bands being classified as Division II, III, and IV.

Sudler Trophy and Sudler Shield

The Sudler Trophy and Sudler Shields are awards bestowed each year by the John Philip Sousa Foundation on one university marching band and one high school marching band. The awards do not represent the winner of any championship, but rather a band surrounded by great tradition that has become respected nationally. No school may be honored with either award twice while under the same director.

Marching bands outside the U.S.

Canada

Most marching bands in Canada are organized by the Canadian Band Association or by Canadian universities:

Royal Military College of Canada Bands
Simon Fraser University Pipe Band 
Western Mustang Band 

Although many bands have still retained the British tradition for marching bands, most have also adopted the style utilized by their American counterparts. Canadian military bands are often associated with civilian marching bands. Many of the civilian marching bands that exist today, such as the Oshawa Civic Band, The Concert Band of Cobourg and the Toronto Signals Band, have military roots and were formerly Canadian Army bands. In the case of the aforementioned bands, their lineage is shared with the bands of The Ontario Regiment, the 6th Northumberland Militia and the 2nd Armoured Divisional Signals Regiment respectively. In the early to mid-20th century, the Canadian Forces maintained drum and bugle corps, which were similar in instrumentation and organization to civilian marching bands.

Taiwan
In Taiwan, the National Marching Band Association is the main organizer of local marching bands in the country. It is currently located at its headquarters in the Neihu District of Taipei City. The Taipei First Girls' High School currently sports one of the most acclaimed marching bands in the country.

Malaysia
The first marching bands were introduced in Malaysia during the British colonial period and has since grown and increased its importance. The most common are found in the Malaysian Armed Forces, however, in recent years, there has been a rise in the number of show bands and drum corps in the country. Although the Ministry of Education organizes most school marching bands, other organizations have made consistent efforts to organize local marching bands.

Russia
In Russia, there are not many school or local marching bands in existence, with most being government-sponsored military and police bands, as well as several bands operated by the local governments. The marching bands of the Russian Armed Forces are organized by the Military Band Service in the Ministry of Defence. Also known as Marshiruyushchiye orkestr (loosely translated to Марширующие оркестр, which means Marching Orchestra in Russian), notable Russian marching bands include the Band and Corps of Drums of the Moscow Military Music College, whose cadets are famous for setting the pace for the annual Victory Day Parades on Red Square. These types of bands only came into existence after 1991 when the Soviet Union ceased to exist. During the Soviet era, civilian like marching bands were extremely rare, with one of the only non-military bands having been employed in the late 1930s and early 1940s during National Sports Day parades in the capital of Moscow. Other Russian marching bands include the Drummers Group of the Boarding School for Girls of the Ministry of Defense of Russia and the Moscow & District Pipe Band. The country has hosted many marching band tattoos within the last 70 years, including the Spasskaya Tower Military Music Festival and Tattoo in Moscow and the Amur Waves International Military Bands Festival in Khabarovsk.

Singapore 
The traditions of both the Singapore Police Force Band and the Singapore Armed Forces Bands soon inspired the creation of the Singaporean marching band tradition. By the 1960s, school and college marching bands, corps of drums and drum and bugle corps began to be commonplace (the latter in cadet units), as well as bands of youth uniformed organizations and universities, all following the armed forces pattern and British and Malayan (later Malaysian) precedence. The People's Association became the first civilian organization to form a dedicated marching band in 1965-66, and the Ministry of Education followed suit with a teachers' band made up of band instructors. Today the Ministry of Education is responsible for overall control over the school, college, university and polytecnic bands within Singapore, with two dedicated cadet bands.

Some of Singapore's oldest high school marching bands are from the Raffles' Institution, St. Joseph's Institution, Victoria School, Bukit Panjang Government HS and the Anglo-Chinese School.

The SPF has the country's three uniformed pipe bands, the Women's Police, SPF and Gurkha Contingent Pipe Bands, all raised in the late 1960s. Civilian pipe bands were formerly present in the PA, Boys Brigade and the Port of Singapore Authority.

See also
 Marching Arts
 Tournament of Bands
 List of marching bands
 Western Band Association
 Marching (sport)
 Booster Club

References

External links
 

Types of musical groups
 
Articles containing video clips
Military marching
Marching

fr:Fanfare#Ensembles musicaux